This is a list of notable Irish American politicians.

To be included in this list, the person must have a Wikipedia article and/or references showing the person is Irish American and a notable politician.

A–L 
 Harry M. Daugherty
 Chester A. Arthur – 21st President of the United States
 David Baird Sr. – born in County Londonderry, Ireland, US Senator
 David Baird Jr. – son of David Baird Sr.; US Senator
 James G. Barry – St. Louis mayor
 William B. Barry – US Congressman
 James Moore (governor)
 Joe Biden – current President of the United States, 47th Vice President of the United States; mother was of Irish ancestry, father of partial Irish ancestry
 Edward P. Boland – US Congressman
 James E. Boyd – Omaha mayor
 Brendan Boyle – US Congressman
 Bob Brady – US Congressman
 William J. Brady – New Mexico Territorial representative and Sheriff of Lincoln County, from County Cavan
 David C. Broderick – US Senator
 John T. Browne – Houston mayor
 William Jennings Bryan – US Secretary of State
 Billy Bulger – President of the Massachusetts State Senate
 Aedanus Burke – US Congressman
 Thomas Burke – North Carolina governor
 Thomas A. Burke – Cleveland mayor, US Senator
 William J. Burke – US Congressman
 Prescott Bush – banker/US Senator
 Brendan Byrne – former Governor of New Jersey
 Jane Byrne – Chicago mayor
 Thomas R. Byrne – St. Paul mayor
 James F. Byrnes – US Senator
 Hugh Carey – New York governor
 Christopher P. Carney – US Congressman
 Charles Carroll of Carrollton – the sole Catholic signatory of the American Declaration of Independence
 Bob Casey Jr. – US Senator and former Pennsylvania state treasurer
 Robert P. Casey – former Pennsylvania governor
 Jerome Cavanagh – Detroit mayor 
 John Michael Clancy – US Congressman
 Grover Cleveland – 22nd and 24th President of the United States
 Bill Clinton – 42nd President of the United States
 DeWitt Clinton – New York City mayor
 W. Bourke Cockran – US Congressman
 John F. Collins – Boston mayor
 Patrick Collins – Boston mayor
 Martin Condon – Knoxville mayor
 John Conness – US Senator
 James Cooney – US Congressman
 John Coughlin – First Ward Alderman in Chicago, 1893–1938
 Richard Croker – Tammany Hall boss
 Joseph Crowley – US Congressman
 Ted Cruz - Texas Senator
 James Michael Curley – legendary Boston mayor, US Congressman, and Massachusetts governor
 Thomas Cusack – US Congressman
 Richard J. Daley – Chicago mayor
 Richard M. Daley – Chicago mayor; son of Richard J. Daley
 William M. Daley – U.S. Secretary of Commerce; son of Richard J. Daley
 Charles Patrick Daly – Chief Justice of New York Court of Common Pleas
 John Darragh – Pittsburgh mayor
 Jefferson Davis – Confederate President
 William Dawson – St. Paul mayor
 Éamon de Valera  (1882–1975) – President of Ireland, dominant political figure in 20th-century Ireland
 John J. Dempsey – New Mexico governor 
 John N. Dempsey – Connecticut governor
Thomas Dongan governor of New York In the 1660s
 Michael Donohoe – US Congressman
 Bob Dornan – former US Congressman from California
 John G. Downey – California governor
 Mike Doyle – US Congressman from Pennsylvania
 James Duane – New York City mayor
 Warren J. Duffey – US Congressman from Ohio, also Ohio's 9th congressional district
 Tom Dunn – Mayor, Elizabeth, New Jersey
 Edward Fitzsimmons Dunne – Chicago mayor and Illinois governor
 Thomas F. Eagleton – US Senator Missouri 1968–1987; grandfather born in County Mayo; paternal grandmother also Irish
 Mark M. Fagan – Jersey City mayor
 Mike Fahey – Omaha mayor
 Thomas Fallon – San Jose mayor
 James A. Farley – Chairman of the Democratic National Committee, US Postmaster General
 John Frederick Finerty – US Congressman
 Joseph E. Finerty – Gary mayor
 John F. Fitzgerald – Boston mayor, father of Rose Kennedy
 John Fitzpatrick – New Orleans mayor
 Mike Fitzpatrick – US Congressman from Pennsylvania
 Thomas Fitzsimons – US Congressman
 Peter F. Flaherty – former Pittsburgh mayor
 Michael P. Flanagan – US Congressman
 Daniel J. Flood – US Congressman from Pennsylvania
 Raymond Flynn – Boston mayor
 William S. Flynn – Rhode Island governor
 Mark Foley – US Congressman from Florida
 Michael Forbes – former US Congressman from New York
 Thomas Gallagher – Pittsburgh mayor
 Martin Galvin – founder of NORAID
 William F. Galvin – Massachusetts Secretary of State
 J. Joseph Garrahy – Rhode Island governor
 William Jay Gaynor – New York City mayor
 Charles P. Gillen – Newark mayor
 Kirsten Gillibrand – US Senator, mother is of Irish descent
 Thomas F. Gilroy – New York City mayor
 James P. Gleason – County executive of Montgomery County, Maryland
 Patrick Gleason – Long Island City political machine boss
 Martin H. Glynn – New York governor
 William R. Grace – New York City mayor
 J. Harold Grady – Baltimore mayor
 William T. Granahan – US Congressman
 Ulysses S. Grant – 18th President of the United States
 Horace Greeley – Newspaper publisher/US Congressman
 James D. Griffin – Mayor of Buffalo, New York, New York State Senator
 Frank Hague – Jersey City mayor
 James M. Hanley – US Congressman
 Warren G. Harding – 29th President of the United States
 Benjamin Harrison – 23rd President of the United States
 Maura Healey – Massachusetts Attorney General
 Jerramiah T. Healy – Jersey City mayor
 William Randolph Hearst – Newspaper publisher/US Congressman
 James J. Heffernan – US Congressman
 Brian Higgins – US Congressman
 John Hogan – US Congressman
Larry Hogan – governor of Maryland
 John Patrick Hopkins – Chicago mayor
 Harry R. Hughes –  Governor of Maryland
 Richard J. Hughes – Governor of New Jersey
 Charles F. Hurley – Massachusetts governor
 Denis M. Hurley – US Congressman
 Robert A. Hurley – Connecticut Governor
 Henry Hyde – US Congressman
 John F. Hylan – New York City mayor
 John B. Hynes – Boston mayor
 Andrew Jackson – 7th President of the United States
 Andrew Johnson – 17th President of the United States
 Lyndon B. Johnson – 36th President of the United States
 Thomas Kean – former Governor of New Jersey
 Frank Keating – Oklahoma governor
 William J. Keating – former Congressman from Ohio
 Augustine B. Kelley – US Congressman
 Patrick H. Kelley – US Congressman
 Edward A. Kelly – US Congressman
 Edward Joseph Kelly – Chicago mayor
 John Kelly – Tammany Hall boss
 Joseph J. Kelly – Buffalo mayor
 Randy Kelly – St. Paul mayor
 Richard C. Kerens – Ambassador to Austria-Hungary 1909–1913
 Michael Kenna – First Ward Alderman in Chicago 1897–1923

 Caroline Kennedy – US Ambassador
 Edward M. Kennedy – longtime US Senator
 Edward M. Kennedy, Jr – Connecticut State Senator
John F. Kennedy – 35th President of the United States
 Joseph P. Kennedy – US Ambassador
 Joseph P. Kennedy II – former US Congressman
 Joseph P. Kennedy III – US Congressman
 Kathleen Kennedy Townsend – former Lieutenant Governor of Maryland
Mark Kennedy – former US Congressman
 Patrick J. Kennedy – former Member Massachusetts House of Representatives; former Massachusetts Senator
Patrick J. Kennedy II – former US Congressman
 Robert F. Kennedy – US Attorney General , US Senator, New York
 Jean Kennedy Smith – former US Ambassador
 Martin H. Kennelly – Chicago mayor
 John V. Kenny – Jersey City mayor
 John Kerrigan – Boston mayor
 Peter T. King – US Congressman
 Conor Lamb – US Congressman
 Patrick Leahy – US Senator, father is of Irish descent
 Huey Long – Louisiana governor
 Robert Lowry – US Congressman
 Stephen Lynch – US Congressman
 Thomas Lynch Jr. – signatory to the Declaration of Independence

M–Z 
 Lisa Madigan – Illinois Attorney General
 Michael Madigan – Illinois Speaker of the House, Illinois Democratic Party Chairman
 George Maguire – St. Louis mayor
 Dan Malloy – Connecticut governor; Stamford, CT mayor
 Sean Patrick Maloney – US Congressman
 Frederick Mansfield – Boston mayor
 Mike Mansfield – US Senator, Ambassador
 Thomas J. Manton – US Congressman
 William McAleer – US Congressman
 Gerald McCann – Jersey City mayor
 Patrick McCarran – US Senator
 Carolyn McCarthy – US Congressman
 Eugene McCarthy – US Senator
 Joseph McCarthy – US Senator
 Kevin McCarthy – US Congressman
 P. H. McCarthy – San Francisco mayor
 William C. McCarthy – Pittsburgh mayor
 Frank McCoppin – San Francisco mayor
 John W. McCormack – Speaker of the House
 Jim McDermott – US Congressman
 John J. McDonough – St. Paul mayor
 Lawrence E. McGann – US Congressman
 J. Howard McGrath – US Senator, Rhode Island governor
 John J. McGrath – US Congressman
 James McGreevey – New Jersey governor
 Edwin D. McGuinness – Providence mayor
 James Kennedy McGuire – Syracuse mayor
 Thomas McKean – signatory to the Declaration of Independence
 Bernard J. McKenna – Pittsburgh mayor
 Joseph McKenna – US Attorney General
 William McKinley – 25th President of the United States
 Hugh McLaughlin – Brooklyn Democratic party boss
 Joseph McLaughlin – US Congressman
 Robert McNamara – United States Secretary of Defense under President John F. Kennedy
 Frank J. McNulty – US Congressman
 Michael R. McNulty – US Congressman
 Marty Meehan – US Congressman
 John Purroy Mitchel – New York City mayor
 Robert M. Moore – Cincinnati mayor
 Jim Moran – US Congressman
 John Morrissey – US Congressman
 William J. Moxley – US Congressman
 Daniel Patrick Moynihan – former US Senator
 P. H. Moynihan – US Congressman
 Bryan Mullanphy – St. Louis mayor
 William D. Mullins – member of the Massachusetts House of Representatives and baseball player
 Charles F. Murphy – Tammany Hall boss
 Dick Murphy – San Diego mayor
 Frank Murphy – Detroit mayor, Michigan governor
 George Murphy – US Senator
 Isaac Murphy – Arkansas governor
 Morgan F. Murphy – US Congressman
 Philip D. Murphy – New Jersey governor
 Timothy Murphy – US Congressman
 Tom Murphy – Pittsburgh mayor
 William T. Murphy – US Congressman
 James C. Murray – US Congressman
 Timothy P. Murray – Lieutenant Governor of Massachusetts
 John Murtha – US Congressman
 Richard Neal – US Congressman
 Richard Nixon – 37th President of the United States
 Michael N. Nolan – Albany mayor
 Mary T. Norton – US Congressman
 Barack Obama – 44th President of the United States
 Frank O'Bannon – Indiana governor
 Christopher D. O'Brien – St. Paul mayor
 Hugh O'Brien – Boston's first Irish mayor
 James O'Brien – US Congressman
 John P. O'Brien – New York City mayor
 Thomas J. O’Brien – US Congressman
 Dan O'Connell – Albany mayor
 Bob O'Connor – Mayor of Pittsburgh
 Maureen O'Connor – San Diego mayor
 Herbert R. O'Conor – Maryland governor
 Kenneth O'Donnell – Senior Aide to President John F Kennedy
 William O'Dwyer – New York City mayor
 James A. O'Gorman – US Senator
 Barratt O'Hara – US Congressman
 Arthur J. O'Keefe – New Orleans mayor
 Martin O'Malley – Baltimore mayor
 Charles H. O'Neill – Jersey City mayor
 Thomas O'Neill – Speaker of the House
 William A. O'Neill – Connecticut governor
 Daniel O'Reilly – US Congressman
 Beto O’Rourke, – US Congressman and Presidential candidate
 George F. O'Shaunessy – US Congressman
 George Pataki – New York governor
 Mike Pence – 48th Vice President of the United States; 50th Governor of Indiana
 Tom Pendergast – Kansas City Democratic machine boss
 James D. Phelan – San Francisco mayor, US Senator
 George Washington Plunkitt – Tammany Hall member
 Samantha Power – US Ambassador
 Jack Quinn – US Congressman
 John Quinn – US Congressman

 Ronald Reagan (1911–2004) – 40th President of the United States (1981–1989); 33rd Governor of California (1967–1975); father was Irish-American
 Thomas Reilly – Massachusetts Attorney General
 Daniel J. Riordan – US Congressman
 Richard Riordan – former Los Angeles mayor
 William R. Roberts – US Congressman
 John J. Rooney – US Congressman
 Jim Ryan – former Illinois Attorney General; father was Irish, mother was Italian
 Paul Ryan – US Congressman and 2012 Vice Presidential nominee; father was of Irish ancestry
 Tim Ryan – US Congressman
 William Ryan – [US Congressman
 Wilson Shannon – Ohio governor
 H. James Shea Jr. – member of the Massachusetts House of Representatives
 William F. Sheehan – Buffalo democratic machine boss
 John Sheridan – New Jersey Transportation Commissioner
 James Shields – US Senator
 Peter Joseph Shields – Superior Court Judge, Jeffersonian Democrat, for 49 years; founder of University of California at Davis, and the McGeorge Law School; son of John Shields, County Donegal, Ireland and Elizabeth Bowe, County Waterford, Ireland
 Sargent Shriver – Democratic politician
 Al Smith – New York governor, Democratic Party presidential candidate (Irish born grandparents from Westmeath; Smith identified as an Irish American)
 James Smith – signatory to the Declaration of Independence
 P.J. Somers – Milwaukee mayor
 Brian P. Stack – Mayor of Union City, New Jersey
 Michael J. Stack – US Congressman
 Christopher D. Sullivan – US Congressman
 James Sullivan – Massachusetts governor
 Patrick Joseph Sullivan – US Senator
 Timothy Sullivan – US Congressman
 Jane Swift – first woman to serve as Massachusetts governor
 William Howard Taft – 27th President of the United States
 James Hugh Joseph Tate – first Catholic mayor of Philadelphia
 George Taylor – signatory to the Declaration of Independence
 Charles Thomson – secretary to the Continental Congress
 Matthew Thornton – signatory to the Declaration of Independence
 John F. Tierney – US Congressman
 Maurice J. Tobin – Boston mayor and Massachusetts governor
 Harry S. Truman – 33rd President of the United States
 Joseph Patrick Tumulty – attorney/secretary to Woodrow Wilson 
 John V. Tunney – US Senator
 William M. Tweed – Political boss/US Congressman
 Jimmy Walker – New York City mayor
 David I. Walsh – Massachusetts' first Catholic governor
 James T. Walsh – US Congressman
 Marty Walsh – Boston mayor
 Patrick Walsh – US Senator
 Thomas W. Ward – Austin mayor
 Thomas J. Whelan – Jersey City mayor
 Woodrow Wilson – 28th President of the United States
 William Whipple – signatory to the Declaration of Independence
 Kevin White – Boston mayor

References

Politicians
Irish descent